Crataegus saligna is a species of hawthorn known by the common name willow hawthorn that is seldom cultivated and rather rare in the wild. Its native range is wet areas of western Colorado and northeastern Utah. It is a shrub or small tree with thin, elongated leaves, small flowers, small black fruit, and reddish bark.

It is related to C. erythropoda and C. rivularis.

Images

See also
 List of hawthorn species with black fruit

References

External links

saligna
Flora of Colorado
Flora of Utah
Flora without expected TNC conservation status